The year 2006 is the eighth year in the history of King of the Cage, a mixed martial arts promotion based in the United States. In 2006 King of the Cage held 20 events, KOTC – Outlaws.

Title fights

Events list

KOTC: Outlaws

KOTC: Outlaws was an event held on January 21, 2006 in Globe, Arizona.

Results

KOTC: Gunfather

KOTC: Gunfather was an event held on February 10, 2006 in Australia.

Results

KOTC: Redemption on the River

KOTC: Redemption on the River was an event held on February 17, 2006 at MARK of the Quad Cities in Moline, Illinois.

Results

KOTC: Battle at Ute Mountain

KOTC: Battle at Ute Mountain was an event held on March 4, 2006 at Ute Mountain Casino in Towaoc, Colorado.

Results

KOTC: Drop Zone

KOTC: Drop Zone was an event held on March 18, 2006 in Mount Pleasant, Michigan.

Results

KOTC: The Return

KOTC: The Return was an event held on March 19, 2006 at Soboba Casino in San Jacinto, California.

Results

KOTC: The Return 2

KOTC: The Return 2 was an event held on March 25, 2006 in San Jacinto, California.

Results

KOTC: Heavy Hitters

KOTC: Heavy Hitters was an event held on April 2, 2006 at Chukchansi Gold Resort & Casino in Coarsegold, California.

Results

KOTC: Unfinished Business

KOTC: Unfinished Business was an event held on April 28, 2006 in Sydney, Australia.

Results

KOTC: Predator

KOTC: Predator was an event held on May 13, 2006 the Apache Gold Casino in Globe, Arizona.

Results

KOTC: Mangler

KOTC: Mangler was an event held on June 9, 2006 at Soboba Casino in San Jacinto, California.

Results

KOTC: Australia

KOTC: Australia was an event held on July 8, 2006 in Australia.

Results

KOTC: Shoot Out

KOTC: Shoot Out was an event held on July 22, 2006 at Tulalip Resort Casino in Seattle, Washington.

KOTC: Civil War

KOTC: Civil War was an event held on July 29, 2006 at Ute Mountain Casino in Towaoc, Colorado.

Results

KOTC: Rapid Fire

KOTC: Rapid Fire was an event held on August 4, 2006 at Soboba Casino in San Jacinto, California.

Results

KOTC: Meltdown

KOTC: Meltdown was an event held on October 7, 2006 at Murat Theater in Indianapolis.

Results

KOTC: BOOYAA

KOTC: BOOYAA was an event held on October 13, 2006 at Soboba Casino in San Jacinto, California.

Results

KOTC: All Stars

KOTC: All Stars was an event held on October 28, 2006 at the Reno Events Center in Reno, Nevada.

Results

KOTC: Cyclone

KOTC: Cyclone was an event held on November 11, 2006 in Tulsa, Oklahoma.

Results

KOTC: Destroyer

KOTC: Destroyer was an event held on December 1, 2006 at Soboba Casino in San Jacinto, California.

Results

See also 
 List of King of the Cage events
 List of King of the Cage champions

References

King of the Cage events
2006 in mixed martial arts